The M19 is a metropolitan route in the eThekwini Metropolitan Municipality, South Africa, connecting Pinetown to Springfield Park in Durban.

Route 
The M19 begins at the M13 off-ramp intersection with the M7 in Pinetown and follows a route north as a dual-carriage roadway named 'St Johns Avenue'.

Shortly after, it then meets the M31 (Josiah Gumede Road) in the Pinetown CBD and proceeds north-east. At the M32 Shepstone Rd/Beviss Rd intersection, the M19 leaves Pinetown to enter New Germany as a dual-carriageway freeway and passes under the M5 Otto Volek Road off-ramp. It then turns eastwards at the M32 Roger Sishi Road off-ramp before proceeding through Westville.

A few kilometres after Dunkeld Road off-ramp, it enters Durban at Reservoir Hills, turns in northeast, passes over the Mountbatten Drive off-ramp and turns in a southeasterly direction. Hereafter, it ends as a freeway east of Reservoir Hills at the massive Umgeni Interchange with the N2 freeway (to KwaDukuza and Port Shepstone).

It continues southeast as a dual-carriage roadway named 'Umgeni Road' through the Springfield Park industrial area and turns in an easterly direction before ending at an interchange with the R102 Chris Hani Road/Umgeni Road (to Avoca and the Durban city centre).

The M19 passes through the following towns and suburbs:

 Pinetown
 New Germany
 Westville
 Reservoir Hills
 Springfield Park

References

Highways in South Africa
Metropolitan Routes in Durban